The discography of Jhené Aiko, an American musical artist, consists of three studio albums, one extended play (EP), one mixtape, 17 singles (including five as a featured artist) and 21 music videos.

Aiko embarked on her career being known as the cousin of American R&B group B2K's rapper, Lil' Fizz, though she is not actually related to him. It was used as a marketing tool, suggested by her labels Sony, The Ultimate Group and Epic Records, to promote her through B2K and attract an audience; nonetheless, Aiko affirms that she and Lil' Fizz grew up together and were close like family. In 2003, her labels released a song titled "No L.O.V.E", as a CD single, which was accompanied by a music video that debuted on BET's 106 & Park, when she was 15 years old. Aiko was then set to release her debut album, My Name Is Jhené, but the album was never released due to tension at Epic, which ultimately led to Aiko asking to be released from the label. She later left the aforementioned labels in order to continue her education.

In March 2011, Aiko made her return to music with the release of her first full-length project, a mixtape titled Sailing Soul(s). On December 16, 2011, she signed a recording contract with American record producer No I.D.'s record label Artium, distributed through Def Jam Recordings. In 2013, she appeared on American rapper Big Sean's single "Beware", also featuring Lil Wayne, which became her first Top 40 hit on the US Billboard Hot 100 chart. In November 2013, she released her first EP, titled Sail Out, which was supported by the singles "3:16AM", "Bed Peace" and "The Worst". In June 2014, she released "To Love & Die", the lead single from her debut studio album Souled Out.

Studio albums

Collaborative albums

Miscellaneous

EPs

Mixtapes

Singles

As lead artist

As featured artist

Promotional singles

Other charted and certified songs

Guest appearances

Music videos

Notes

References

External links
 
 
 
 

Discographies of American artists
Contemporary R&B discographies
 
 
Soul music discographies